Christophe Leininger, is an American former judoka who was 1984, 1988, and 1992 US Olympic Judo Team Alternate.   He was born in 1959. His brother Bryan Leininger was also a judo competitor.  While his father Maurice was a French Judo champion. He is a two time US National Judo Champion and a two time US Judo open champion.  He competed in a number of mixed martial arts fights included in Ultimate Fighting Championship.

Career

Ultimate Fighting Championship
Leininger made his debut in Ultimate Fighting Championship's UFC 3 event, being billed as the second ranked American judoka in his weight class at the time. Going against shoot wrestler Ken Shamrock, Leininger started by trying a morote gari, but Shamrock protected against it and ended up in Christophe's guard. The judoka then tried an armbar, only for Shamrock to turn him over and stack him against the fence, raining punches and headbutts on him for the tap out. Shamrock crossfaced Leininger so hard into the mat that Leininger admitted to being knocked out for a second, and he later was revealed to have suffered a mild concussion.

He returned at UFC 13 against Ken Shamrock's teammate Guy Mezger. Leininger tried to take the fight to the ground, at one point scoring a tomoe nage and transitioning it into a mount position, but Mezger was able to return to his feet every time. After a restart, Mezger hit a clearly tired Leininger with kicks to the legs and head, but the affair was inconclusive and the match went to overtime. There Mezger continued punishing Leininger with strikes, finally earning a decision win.

Mixed martial arts record

|-
|Loss
|align=center| 3–4
|Edwin Dewees
|Decision (Unanimous)
|RITC 26: Rage in the Cage 26
|
|align=center| 3
|align=center| 3:00
|Phoenix, Arizona, United States
|
|-
|Loss
|align=center| 3–3
|Allan Sullivan
|Decision
|RITC 24: Rage in the Cage 24
|
|align=center| 3
|align=center| 3:00
|Phoenix, Arizona, United States
|
|-
|Loss
|align=center| 3–2
|Guy Mezger
|Decision (unanimous)
|UFC 13
|
|align=center| 1
|align=center| 15:00
|Augusta, Georgia, United States
|
|-
|-
|Win
|align=center| 2–1
|Marc Zee
|Submission (armbar)
|FCSB: Best in the Southwest Championships
|
|align=center| 1
|align=center| 4:55
|United States
|
|-
|Win
|align=center| 1–1
|Kelly English
|Submission (armbar)
|FCSB: Best in the Southwest Championships
|
|align=center| 2
|align=center| 1:16
|Charlotte, North Carolina, United States
|
|-
|Win
|align=center| 3–1
|Carlos Garcia
|Submission (choke)
|FCSB: Best in the Southwest Championships
|
|align=center| 1
|align=center| 6:00
|United States
|-
|Loss
|align=center| 0–1
|Ken Shamrock
|TKO (submission to punches)
|UFC 3
|
|align=center| 1
|align=center| 4:49
|Charlotte, North Carolina, United States
|

References

External links
 
 

1975 births
Sportspeople from Scottsdale, Arizona
American male judoka
American male mixed martial artists
Light heavyweight mixed martial artists
Mixed martial artists utilizing judo
Living people
Pan American Games medalists in judo
Pan American Games silver medalists for the United States
Judoka at the 1991 Pan American Games
Medalists at the 1991 Pan American Games
Ultimate Fighting Championship male fighters
20th-century American people